DXSY (96.1 FM), broadcasting as 96.1 Radyo BisDak, is a radio station owned and operated by Times Broadcasting Network Corporation. The station's studio is located at 2/F Paguito Yu Bldg., Mabini Extension, Brgy. Carmen Annex, Ozamiz City. Formerly the station was affiliated with RMN until 2016.

References

Radio stations in Misamis Occidental
Radio stations established in 1990